The Portland metropolitan area in the U.S. state of Oregon has a variety of nearby tourist attractions which are suitable for a day trip from the Portland area, in addition to about 80 within the metropolitan area itself (see Tourism in Portland, Oregon).

Generally, there is no public transportation to these destinations, though exceptions are noted in descriptions.  The communities have at most small airports serving only general aviation; scheduled airline service is available only to Portland and Eugene.

See also
 Lists of Oregon-related topics

Portland, Oregon-related lists
Portland tourist attractions
Portland